The first Khaleda cabinet was the Government of Bangladesh during the 5th legislative session of the Jatiya Sangsad following the 1991 Bangladeshi general election. The cabinet took office in 1991 and left office in January 1996. The Prime Minister and head of the government was Khaleda Zia.

Ministers
The following table is the list of Ministers.

State ministers

Deputy ministers

References

Political history of Bangladesh
Cabinets established in 1991
Cabinets disestablished in 1996
Khaleda Zia ministries